The 1956–57 daytime network television schedule for the three major English-language commercial broadcast networks in the United States covers the weekday daytime hours from September 1956 to August 1957.

Talk shows are highlighted in yellow, local programming is white, reruns of prime-time programming are orange, game shows are pink, soap operas are chartreuse, news programs are gold and all others are light blue. New series are highlighted in bold.

Monday-Friday 

Comedy Time featured repeats of I Married Joan (fall/summer), It's a Great Life (winter), Dear Phoebe (spring-summer), and Topper (spring).

Saturday

Sunday

See also
1956-57 United States network television schedule (prime-time)
1956-57 United States network television schedule (late night)

Sources
 https://web.archive.org/web/20071015122215/http://curtalliaume.com/abc_day.html
 https://web.archive.org/web/20071015122235/http://curtalliaume.com/cbs_day.html
 https://web.archive.org/web/20071012211242/http://curtalliaume.com/nbc_day.html
 Castleman & Podrazik, The TV Schedule Book, McGraw-Hill Paperbacks, 1984
 Hyatt, The Encyclopedia Of Daytime Television, Billboard Books, 1997
 TV schedules, New York Times, September 1956 – September 1957 (microfilm)

United States weekday network television schedules
1956 in American television
1957 in American television